Agapostemon tyleri is a species of sweat bee in the family Halictidae.

References

Further reading

 

tyleri
Articles created by Qbugbot
Insects described in 1917